The brown-breasted flycatcher or Layard's flycatcher (Muscicapa muttui) is a small passerine bird in the flycatcher family Muscicapidae. The species breeds in north eastern India, central and Southern China and northern Burma and Thailand, and migrates to southern India and Sri Lanka. It forages for insects below the forest canopy, often close to the forest floor.

Description

The brown-breasted flycatcher is 13–14 cm in length and weighs between 10-14 g. The overall colour of the upper parts is olive brown. Some of the feather shafts are darker. The upper tail coverts are brighter rufous as are the edges of the flight feathers. The tail feathers have rufous on the outer webs. The lores are pale and the eye ring is conspicuous. The chin and throat are white while the breast and sides of the body are pale brown. The middle of the body to the vent is buffy white. Submoustachial stripes are faint but mark the boundary of the pale chin while the legs and lower mandible are pale flesh coloured. The most similar species is the Asian brown flycatcher, which has black rather than pale legs. It was named by Layard after Muttu, his servant who brought him the specimen.

Although no ringing evidence exists to prove their migration, it is thought that the winter migrants in southern India and Sri Lanka come from north-east India and northern Thailand.

The usual call is very faint  audible only at close range or a series of notes  ending with a low .

References

brown-breasted flycatcher
Birds of China
Birds of Myanmar
Birds of Northeast India
Birds of Yunnan
brown-breasted flycatcher
Taxa named by Edgar Leopold Layard